The Parliamentary Assembly of Bosnia and Herzegovina is the bicameral legislative body of Bosnia and Herzegovina. It consists of the following two chambers.

The House of Representatives (Bosnian and Serbian: Predstavnički dom / Представнички дом, Croatian: Zastupnički dom) has 42 members, elected for a four-year terms by proportional representation.
The House of Peoples (Dom naroda / Дом народа) has 15 members, appointed by the parliaments of the entities: 5 members elected by the National Assembly of Republika Srpska (5 Serbian delegates), 5 members - by the Bosniak club of the House of Peoples of the Parliament of the Federation of Bosnia and Herzegovina (5 Bosniak delegates) and 5 members - by the Croat club of the House of Peoples of the Parliament of the Federation of Bosnia and Herzegovina (5 Croatian delegates).

Its predecessors were the unicameral Assembly of Bosnia and Herzegovina and the People's Assembly of SR Bosnia and Herzegovina.

Presidents (1953–1997)

Presidents of the People's Assembly (1953–1992)

Speakers of the Assembly (1992–1997)

See also
Politics of Bosnia and Herzegovina
Historical assemblies:
Stanak
Diet of Bosnia
List of legislatures by country

References

External links

BiH Parliament Official website 

 
Bosnia and Herzegovina
Bosnia and Herzegovina
Bosnia and Herzegovina
Political organizations based in Bosnia and Herzegovina
Bosnia and Herzogovina parliaments